Norman Leslie Wilson (13 December 1922 – 10 October 2001) was a New Zealand rugby union player. A hooker, Wilson represented Otago at a provincial level, and was a member of the New Zealand national side, the All Blacks, from 1949 to 1951. He played 20 matches for the All Blacks including three internationals. Between 1975 and 1987 he was a comments man for rugby on TV One.

Wilson studied at the University of Otago, graduating with a Bachelor of Arts in 1953.

References

1922 births
2001 deaths
Rugby union players from Masterton
People educated at Wairarapa College
Rugby union hookers
New Zealand rugby union players
New Zealand international rugby union players
Otago rugby union players
University of Otago alumni